Irvin Sello Mhlambi (born 17 August 1984) is a South African football striker. He currently formerly played for the Premier Soccer League club Orlando Pirates. In August 2010 he joined the First Division side African Warriors.

Joined Pirates: 2007
Previous clubs: Benoni Premier United, Maritzburg City

References

1984 births
South African soccer players
Living people
Association football forwards
Orlando Pirates F.C. players
African Warriors F.C. players